Mihăilești is a commune in Buzău County, Muntenia, Romania. It is composed of four villages: Colțăneni, Mărgineanu, Mihăilești and Satu Nou.

The Mihăilești explosion took place there in 2004.

References

Communes in Buzău County
Localities in Muntenia